Madden is a hamlet in southern Alberta, Canada, under the jurisdiction of Rocky View County.

The hamlet was named after Bernard Madden, an early pioneer and a prominent rancher who arrived in the area in 1876. The post office was opened on May 1, 1931.

Madden has a community hall and curling rink, meat processor, campground, fire station and an 18-hole golf course. Madden has also been host to a few film crews, including the 2008 production Mayerthorpe (seen on CTV), which was shot at various locations near the hamlet.

Madden was once located on a Canadian Pacific Railway spur from Collicutt to Cremona and had two elevators. The rail grade can still be seen as it goes west from the hamlet through the Ag Society grounds and east towards Nier Lakes.

Climate

Demographics 

population of Madden according to the 2018 municipal census conducted by Rocky View County is 26, an increase from its 2013 municipal census population count of 21.

See also 
List of communities in Alberta
List of hamlets in Alberta

References 

Karamitsanis, Aphrodite (1992). Place Names of Alberta – Volume II, Southern Alberta, University of Calgary Press, Calgary, Alberta.

Read, Tracey (1983). Acres and Empires – A History of the Municipal District of Rocky View, Calgary, Alberta.

Calgary Region
Designated places in Alberta
Hamlets in Alberta
Rocky View County